Muhammad Dipatuan Kudarat (1581–1671) was the 7th Sultan of Maguindanao from 1619 to 1671. During his reign, he successfully fought off Spanish invasions and halted the spread of Catholicism on the island of Mindanao, much like the other Muslim rulers in the southern Philippines. He was a direct descendant of Shariff Kabungsuwan, a Malay-Arab noble from Johor who brought Islam to Mindanao between the 13th and 14th centuries. The Soccsksargen province of Sultan Kudarat is named after him, as is the municipality of Sultan Kudarat, Maguindanao, where his descendants, who bear the rank of Datu, are current political leaders.

Rule and sovereignty
Sultan Dipatuan Kudarat, the Corralat according to prolific Spanish historian Combes. The word Dipatuan is Malay in origin and means "master" or "sir." The word Qudarat is Arabic and means "power." The letters d and q and r and / are interchangeable in Moro, and Qudarat is commonly pronounced qudlat or kurlat; hence the  corrupted form "Corralat."

Sultan Kudarat overshadowed his father, Buisan, and ruled with a strong hand. He was probably the strongest and greatest Mindanao sultan that ever lived. He fought the Spaniards well and held their sovereignty in check for many years. His sea warriors constantly attacked Luzon and Visayas for allowing themselves to become foot soldiers of the newly arrived Iberians, and providing them provisions and passage. His sultanate controlled the southern seas for a long time.

In 1636, General Corcuera led an expedition against him and after considerable difficulty reduced his fort and defeated his forces. Kudarat had a large quantity of gunpowder and firearms, and his fort was strongly fortified. The Spaniards captured 8 bronze cannons, 27 Lantaka or culverins, and 100 muskets.

In 1645, his relations with then Imperial Spain had undergone a distinct change. He had become more powerful, but he was naturally desirous of peace and made a treaty with the Spanish government. This treaty was in the nature of an alliance for mutual aid and protection. It secured better commercial facilities and gave the Jesuits the privilege of building a church in the sultan's capital. Thirteen years later hostilities were renewed and another campaign was directed against Simway. This time Kudarat succeeded in blocking the river at different places and successfully checked the invasion.

Kudarat was the most famous ruler of the Maguindanaoans. He succeeded his father as Sultan of Maguindanao in 1619 and was titled Katchil.

In 1619–1621, there was a war between him and the Rajah Buayan that was either dynastic in character or a contest for primacy in the Pulangi. Both sides asked help from the Dutch East Indies who decided to stay neutral but who warned them that the war was only to the advantage of the Spanish conquistador.

In 1622, Kudarat appeared to have suffered some reverses which led him to sail to Cebu to pillage some artillery from the Spaniards. Soon after this, he was able to hold his own against attempts of Buayan Sultanate to solely control the lucrative Pulangi waterways.

In 1625–1626, because its Datu, an ally of Kudarat, was ousted, Kudarat attacked the island of Sarangani, burned its capital, slew scores of his enemies, and captured many others. The people of Sarangani were then made part of the Sultanate and tributary to him.

In 1627, Sultan Munkay Datu Maputi (Amunkaya), whose father, Rajah Buayan Silongan is the instructor of then young Kudarat in Kampilan and Kalis martial arts. Rajah Buayan Silongan and his brother, Datu Mangubal are the ones who led the first Mindanao defense against the Conquistador Figueroa, thus Kudarat grew up in his experienced court inland the Buayan Sultanate. This successor and young ruler of Buayan, recognized Kudarat as his co-equal partner in the defense of the great length of Pulangi. The next year, the Dutch sent an ambassador to discuss plans for a concerted effort against the Spaniards. Kudarat knew that the Dutch were using him as a tool for their own imperialistic policies; so he put in a few conditions of his own which the Dutch were not willing to accept. At this time, Kudarat was rightly apprehensive about Spanish missionary activities in areas like Butuan, Caraga, and Dapitan which the Iranun feared would be used as bases against them in the future as the usual coloniser pattern of the Spaniards in the Visayas.

The garrisoning of the Lumad into Reducciones in Caraga caused Kudarat to act. He induced the people there to resist with the result that it took the Spaniards more than two years to pacify the indigenous of Caraga. The Spaniards blamed the fierceness of the resistance to the persuasion and Kudarat's aid.

In 1634, his men called the Sulugs to join him in an attack on the Spanish Reduccion in Dapitan and further on the Visayas where Europeans always get men to populate most of their villages. To protect their settlements and contain the activities of the Maguindanaoans, the Spaniards, on Jesuit advice, built a strong fort in Sambuwangan (Zamboanga) the year after. Fear of the growing strength of Kudarat led the Spaniards to lead an expedition inland to Mindanao in 1637. The aims were to destroy his Kota (cottas), capture or kill him, and make Catholics of the Muslims as well as the non-Muslim Lumads in Mindanao. Sebastian Hurtado de Corcuera, the experienced Spanish governor general from Mexico, personally led the expedition. He also brought with his thousands of soldiers and settlers from Peru.

Kudarat's capital of Lamitan (close to the present Baras) fell on 
March 13, 1637, and one of the first things the Spaniards did was to burn its Mosque. Kudarat, with 2,000 of his warriors, retreated to three cottas in the nearby heights. In spite of the determined and brave defense of the Iranun, the cottas fell one by one. The Spaniards were able to capture treasures, signifying the accumulation of many years. Kudarat was wounded in the defense and he was brought to the interior of the Butig area by his warriors to recover. In a short while, he was able to raise a new army and get the sympathy of the Samal in Zamboanga and the Iranun on Illana Bay area.

Soon, Spanish shipping, forts and garrisons began to be harassed. The Spaniards, too, were having trouble with Buayan Sultanate's Datu Maputi attack, who, while happy about Kudarat's former reverses, had "no intention to have the Spaniards as his new masters".

In 1639, the Spaniards invaded the lands of the Maranaos. Kudarat hurried there to have a conference with the datus of the Lake Lanao. He explained to them the effects of submitting to the Spaniards and appealed to Maranao pride and love of 
independence. In a matter of months, the Spaniards were forced to leave hurriedly the lands of the Maranaos for safer parts towards Zamboanga, which is Fort Pilar, and never ventured to inland Lanao again.

The famous speech of Sultan Kudarat is recorded by a Spanish ambassador to the Maguindanao Sultanate:

True as the speech, the Maranao after offering patient defense, thereafter enjoyed 250 years of peace during the whole duration of Spanish withdrawal in the archipelago in 1899.

By the end of 1639, an understanding was also reached between Kudarat and Datu Maputi for a united front against the Spanish invaders. Datu Manakior, Datu of Tawlan, who was previously friendly with the Spaniards, at this time, began to really suffer serious reverses in Mindanao with his European allies.

In 1642, Kudarat almost massacred a Spanish expedition coming to attack his new capital in Simuay. Spanish forts were soon abandoned as the Europeans retreated.

In 1645, the Zamboanga governor personally went to Simuay to beg a peace treaty with the redoubtable Datu. In this treaty, Kudarat was recognized as sovereign over the whole contiguous area from Sibugay River to Tagalook Bay (the present Davao Gulf) while Bukidnon and part of the present Cagayan de Oro were asserted as 
belonging to his sphere of political and military influence. By this time, Kudarat had 
formally assumed the title of Sultan.

In 1649, the peace between Kudarat and the Spaniards nearly broke when the latter made incursions in his territories and captured some of his indigenous vassals. Hasty explanations from the hurriedly-sent Spanish ambassador kept the tenuous peace.

However, in 1655, relations with the Spanish once again started to deteriorate. The 
Maguindanao and Buayan sultanates refused to accept Jesuit missionaries due to their conduct. There were mutual accusations concerning bad faith regarding the return of captives and artillery. Things came to a head when Baratamay, the new Rajah of Buayan, had two Jesuit priests killed, one of them an Ambassador who had previously insulted the Sultan by insisting on his conversion to Catholicism. Anticipating a strong Spanish 
retaliation, Sultan Kudarat wrote to his allies and vassals to take up arms against the Spaniards. Declaring Jihad, he wrote 
to the Sultans of Sulu, Ternate, Brunei, and Makassar to support the struggle which he proclaimed was a defense of Islam and the Shari'ah. The Spanish offensive did not materialise, as they know that the Moro are ready according to their expectations. A tit for tat war then ensued. Once again, the Spaniards were expelled from the Great Pulangi.

In 1662, on account of the Koxinga threat, the Spaniards, in spite of Jesuit objections, decided to abandon their forts in Ternate and 
Zamboanga (Sambuwangan). In 1663, Zamboanga was abandoned and the Samals there became vassals of Kudarat while most of the indigenous Catholic converts reverted to Islam. There was then to be a long peace between Kudarat as the Spaniards kept their distance.

In 1671, after a reign of more than fifty years, the Sultan died of old age. In his last years, he was being considered a "holy" man. Actually, he was learned man in Islamic jurisprudence Fiqh and was considered to be one of the best Panditas of the reign. He was an extremely pious man and fulfilled all of his Islamic duties. Utterly brave, he was invariably magnanimous in victory. His regal name was Nasir ud-Din, that is, "Helper of the Faith." He is buried near a sea embankment in Simuay.

He died at about 1671 at the age of 90, and his grandchildren referred to him always as Nasir ud-Din. He is always remembered in Mindanao even to this day.

Gallery

References

External links

Biographies
Sultan Dipatuan Kudarat

1581 births
1671 deaths
Filipino datus, rajas and sultans
Filipino Muslims
Filipino people of Malay descent
People of Spanish colonial Philippines
Paramilitary Filipinos
16th-century rulers in Asia
17th-century rulers in Asia